For Réunion (French : Pour La Réunion) is a political party on Réunion.

History 
The party was founded in 2012, after a split with the Communist Party of Réunion. They endorsed Jean-Luc Mélenchon in the 2017 French presidential election.

The party is part of the New People's Ecologist and Social Union alliance for the 2022 French legislative election.

Ideology 
For Réunion is a socialist party which identifies as post-Marxist.

Leadership 
The party is led by Huguette Bello.

Elected representatives 

 Karine Lebon, Member of the French Parliament
 Frédéric Maillot, Member of the French Parliament

References 

Political parties in Réunion
Communist parties in Réunion
Political parties established in 2012
2012 establishments in France
Socialist parties in France
Socialist parties in Africa